In several French-speaking countries and international organisations, a  (French; literally 'head of office') is a senior civil servant or official who acts as an aide or private secretary to a high-ranking government figure, typically a minister. They typically work in the ministerial office.

The title is used by the head of an office in the United Nations Secretariat, appointed by the Secretary-General, or in the European Commission, appointed by an individual European Commissioner for their personal cabinet. The position's rank and responsibilities are equivalent to a chief of staff. The current  to the United Nations Secretary-General is Courtenay Rattray of Jamaica.

References 

Chiefs of staff
French words and phrases